The Dewoitine 37 was the first of a family of 1930s French-built monoplane fighter aircraft.

Design and development
The D.37 was a single-seat aircraft of conventional configuration. Its fixed landing gear used a tailskid. The open cockpit was located slightly aft of the parasol wing. The radial engine allowed for a comparatively wide fuselage and cockpit.

Design of this machine was by SAF-Avions Dewoitine but owing to over work at that companies plant at the time, manufacture of the D.37/01 was transferred to Lioré et Olivier. They were high-wing monoplanes of all-metal construction with valve head blisters on their engine cowlings. The first prototype flew in October 1931. Flight testing resulted in the need for multiple revisions in both engine and airframe, so it was February 1934 before the second prototype flew. Its performance prompted the French government to order for 28 for the Armée de l'Air and Aéronavale. The Lithuanian government ordered 14 that remained in service with their Air Force until 1936, when they were sold to the Spanish Republican government.

Operational history

The Spanish Civil War
In spite of its superior speed, this design failed to impress and was even refused when exported to Lithuania in 1935. An important competitor of the Dewoitine D.37 family was the Polish PZL P.24, a similar type but with better speed and armament. 

In 1936, at the beginning of the Spanish Civil War, 12 or 14 D.371s were sold, unofficially, to the Spanish Republic as part of a squadron of volunteers organized secretly by André Malraux, named España. They were, however, unarmed due to the political stance of the French government that declared its neutrality very early.

In August of the same year, after some negotiations with the French government, three fully armed D.371s arrived in Barcelona, piloted by the mercenary pilots M. Poulain, René Halotier and Henri Rozés. They saw action as escorts of a bombing raid against Talavera de la Reina, Toledo that destroyed the headquarters of General Juan Yagüé. These three D.371s had successfully defended their bombers against the attacks of six German Heinkel He 51 biplane fighters - an older-design aircraft with inferior performance.

The Squadron España operated with these aircraft until the arrival of the modern Polikarpov I-15 and I-16, at which time the three Dewoitine 371s were withdrawn from the front and continued as training aircraft. However, they reappeared later in some squadrons and one is known to have flown with the 71 Fighter Group by the Yugoslav (Slovenian) volunteer pilot Josip Križaj. All Dewoitines left were practically destroyed after having been bombed by the Legion Condor aircraft in the airfield of Bañolas.

Variants

D.37 (D.370) A single prototype constructed by Lioré-et-Olivier, powered by a  Gnome-Rhône 14Kds 14 cylinder 2-row radial engine.

D.371 The first production version for the Armée de l'Air, first flown in March 1934, powered by a  Gnome-Rhône 14Kfs; 29 built. Equipped with wheel brakes and two  MAC 1934 machine guns mounted in the wings, outside the propeller arc.

D.372 Follow-on version, not equipped with wheel brakes, powered by  Gnome-Rhône 14Kfs Mistral Major engines. Two machine guns were mounted in the engine cowling, synchronised to fire through the propeller arc, and two more were mounted in the wings, outside the propeller arc, some had an armament of two  cannon in under-wing fairings instead. At least 14 were built for the Lithuanian Air Force, which were very quickly transferred to the Spanish Republican Air Force, alongside some D.371s.

D.373Navalised version, 19 built for Aeronavale, powered by a  Gnome-Rhône 14Kfs engines and armed with four MAC 1934 machine guns.

D.376Twenty-five folding-wing versions were also built for the Aeronavale.

Operators

Armée de l'Air
Aeronavale

Spanish Republican Air Force

Specifications (D.371)

See also

References

Notes

Bibliography

External links

Aircraft that took part in the Spanish Civil War 
Dewoitine 371 in Spain. Short History and Characteristics (Spanish)
A photo & profile
 A profile

1930s French fighter aircraft
World War II French fighter aircraft
D.37
Parasol-wing aircraft
Single-engined tractor aircraft
Aircraft first flown in 1932